C.N.Visvanathan (born 28 April 1947) or Chetpet Natarajan Visvanathan was an Indian politician from the All India Anna Dravida Munnetra Kazhagam.

Public life 

Visvanathan joined the All India Anna Dravida Munnetra Kazhagam at an early age. In 1977, he stood for election from Thirupattur Lok Sabha constituency and was elected to the Lok Sabha or lower house of the Indian Parliament.

References

External links
 

1947 births
Living people
All India Anna Dravida Munnetra Kazhagam politicians
Lok Sabha members from Tamil Nadu
India MPs 1977–1979